John Cleo Shaffer (August 13, 1909 – June 17, 1963) was an American professional basketball player. He appeared in six games for the Akron Firestone Non-Skids in the National Basketball League during the 1937–38 season. A son of Russian immigrants, he grew up in Grand Island, Nebraska and attended the Grand Island campus of Doane University before enrolling at DePaul University. He died of a heart attack in 1963.

References

1909 births
1963 deaths
Akron Firestone Non-Skids players
American men's basketball players
Basketball players from Nebraska
Centers (basketball)
DePaul Blue Demons men's basketball players
Doane Tigers men's basketball players
Forwards (basketball)
People from Grand Island, Nebraska
American people of Russian descent